Unión Pesquero is a Peruvian football club, playing in the city of Ilo, Moquegua, Peru.

History
Unión Pesquero is of the clubs with greater tradition in the city of Ilo, Moquegua.

The club have played at the highest level of Peruvian football on one occasion, in 1974 Torneo Descentralizado when was relegated with only 22 points.

See also
List of football clubs in Peru
Peruvian football league system

External links
 1974 Peruvian Primera Division

Football clubs in Peru